Associação Desportiva de Machico, or simply Machico is a sports club based in the city of Machico, on the Portuguese island of Madeira.

They are notable mainly for their professional volleyball team (See: A.D. Machico (volleyball)) and for their Second Division semi-professional football team, who play their home games at the brand-new 3,300-seat capacity Estádio Municipal do Machico. The club also compete in others sports at amateur level in futsal, karate and swimming.

Honours
 AF Madeira Championship: 2
1975–76, 1989–90
 AF Madeira Cup: 2
 1972–73, 1998–99

See also
A.D. Machico (volleyball)

External links
Official website (in Portuguese)
UltrasTricolor official website (in Portuguese)

Football clubs in Portugal
Sports clubs established in 1969
Sport in Madeira
1969 establishments in Portugal
Machico